String Quartet No. 4 is the fourth of seventeen works in the genre by the Brazilian composer Heitor Villa-Lobos, written in 1917 and revised in 1949. A performance lasts approximately 23 minutes.

History
Villa-Lobos composed his Fourth Quartet in 1917, in Rio de Janeiro, but the work remained unperformed until 1949, at which time the composer revised the score. This version was premiered by the Borgerth String Quartet (also known as the Carioca Quartet) on 8 October 1949 in Rio de Janeiro. The score is dedicated to Frederico Nascimento Filho.

Analysis
The quartet consists of four movements:
 Allegro con moto 
 Andantino (tranquillo) 
 Scherzo (Allegro vivace) 
 Allegro 

The Fourth Quartet marks the end of Villa-Lobos's early period of exploration of the form. It is somewhat simpler than its three predecessors, and the parts move more independently and expressively. The main theme of the first movement strongly recalls the opening measures of the First and Second Quartets, but the second movement introduces a Brazilian character with a cello melody that avoids the second scale degree, like the Afro-Brazilian Xangô tunes.

Discography
In order of dates of recording.
 Villa-Lobos: Quatuors a Cordes Nos. 4/5/6. Quatuor Bessler-Reis (Bernardo Bessler, Michel Bessler, violins; Marie-Christine Springuel, viola; Alceu Reis, cello). Recorded at Studios Master in Rio de Janeiro, June–August 1987. CD recording, 1 disc: digital, 12 cm, stereo. Le Chant du Monde LDC 278 901. France: [S.n.], 1988.
 Also issued as part of Villa-Lobos: Os 17 quartetos de cordas / The 17 String Quartets. Quarteto Bessler-Reis and Quarteto Amazônia. CD recording, 6 sound discs: digital, 12 cm, stereo. Kuarup Discos KCX-1001 (KCD 045, M-KCD-034, KCD 080/1, KCD-051, KCD 042). Rio de Janeiro: Kuarup Discos, 1996.
 Heitor Villa-Lobos: String Quartets Nos. 4, 6 and 14. Danubius Quartet (Judit Tóth and Adél Miklós, violins; Cecilia Bodolai, viola; Ilona Wibli, cello). Recorded at the Hungaroton Studios in Budapest, 18–19, 22–25 April, and 20–23 May 1991. CD recording, 1 disc: digital, 12 cm, stereo. Marco Polo 8.223391. A co-production with Records International. Germany: HH International, Ltd., 1992.
 Villa-Lobos: String Quartets, Volume 6. Quartets Nos. 4, 9, 11. Cuarteto Latinoamericano (Saúl Bitrán, Arón Bitrán, violins; Javier Montiel, viola; Alvaro Bitrán, cello). Recorded at the Sala Blas Galindo of the Centro Nacional de las Artes in Mexico City, 31 July – 3 August 2000. Music of Latin American Masters. CD recording, 1 disc: digital, 12 cm, stereo. Dorian DOR-93229. Troy, NY: Dorian Recordings, 2001.
 Reissued as part of Heitor Villa-Lobos: The Complete String Quartets. 6 CDs + 1 DVD with a performance of Quartet No. 1 and interview with the Cuarteto Latinoamericano. Dorian Sono Luminus. DSL-90904. Winchester, VA: Sono Luminus, 2009.
 Also reissued (without the DVD) on Brilliant Classics 6634.

Filmography
 Villa-Lobos: A integral dos quartetos de cordas. Quarteto Radamés Gnattali (Carla Rincón, Francisco Roa, violins; Fernando Thebaldi, viola; Hugo Pilger, cello); presented by Turibio Santos. Recorded from June 2010 to September 2011 at the Palácio do Catete, Palácio das Laranjeiras, and the Theatro Municipal, Rio de Janeiro. DVD and Blu-ray (VIBD11111), 3 discs. Rio de Janeiro: Visom Digital, 2012.

References

Cited sources

Further reading
 Béhague, Gerard. 1979. Music in Latin America: An Introduction. New Jersey: Prentice-Hall.
 Béhaque, Gerard. 1994. Heitor Villa-Lobos: The Search for Brazil's Musical Soul. Austin: Institute of Latin American Studies, University of Texas at Austin.
 Béhague, Gerard. 2003. Villa-Lobos, Heitor: String Quartets, Cuarteto Latinoamericano. [review] Latin American Music Review / Revista de Música Latinoamericana 24, no. 2 (Autumn–Winter): 293–94.
 Estrella, Arnaldo. 1978. Os quartetos de cordas de Villa-Lobos, second edition. Rio de Janeiro: Museu Villa-Lobos, Ministério da Educação e Cultura.
 Farmer, Virginia. 1973. "An Analytical Study of the Seventeen String Quartets of Heitor Villa-Lobos". DMA diss. Urbana: University of Illinois at Urbana-Champaign.
 Gilman, Bruce. 1999. "Enigma de vanguardia", translated by Juan Arturo  Brennan. Pauta: Cuadernos de teoría y crítica musical 17, no. 69 (January–March): 29–34.
  Kraehenbuehl, David. 1957.  "George Rochberg: String Quartet, 1952. (Society for the Publication of American Music, 37th Season, 1956.) New York: Society for the Publication of American Music; distr.: Carl Fischer, 1957; Toch, Ernst. Dedication. For string quartet or string orchestra, with optional bass part. New York: Mills, 1957. Heitor Villa-Lobos: String Quartets, Nos. 4, 7, and 12. New York: Associated Music Publishers, 1956; Ernest Gold: String Quartet No. 1. (Society for the Publication of American Music, 37th Season, 1956.) New York: Society for the Publication of American Music; distr.: Carl Fischer, 1957".  Notes 15, no. 1 (December): 147.
 Macedo Ribeiro, Roberto. 2000. "A escrita contrapontística nos quartetos de cordas de Heitor Villa-Lobos". In Anais do I Colóquio de Pesquisa de Pós-Graduação, edited by Marisa Rezende and Mário Nogueira, 71–76. Rio de Janeiro: Universidade Federal do Rio de Janeiro (UFRJ) (Escola de Música).
 Tarasti, Eero. 2009. "Villa-Lobos's String Quartets". In Intimate Voices: The Twentieth-Century String Quartet, vol. 1: Debussy to Villa-Lobos, edited by Evan Jones, 223–55. Eastman Studies in Music 70. Rochester, NY: University of Rochester Press. ; ; .
 Villa-Lobos, sua obra: Programa de Ação Cultural. 1972. Second edition. Rio de Janeiro: MEC, DAC, Museu Villa-Lobos.
 Villa-Lobos, Heitor. 1972. "Quartetos de cordas (do número 1 ao 8)". In Villa-Lobos, sua obra, second edition, 229–30. Rio de Janeiro: MEC/DAC/Museu Villa-Lobos.
 Villa-Lobos, sua obra. 2009. Version 1.0. MinC / IBRAM, and the Museu Villa-Lobos. Based on the third edition, 1989.

String quartets by Heitor Villa-Lobos
1917 compositions
1949 compositions
Music with dedications